Psoloptera leucosticta is a moth in the subfamily Arctiinae. It was described by Jacob Hübner in 1809. It is found in Pará, Brazil.

References

Moths described in 1809
Euchromiina